Geir is a masculine name commonly given in Norway and Iceland. It is derived from Old Norse geirr "spear", a common name element in Germanic names in general, from Proto-Germanic *gaizaz (whence also Old High German gêr, Old English gâr, Gothic gaisu).

The popularity of the given name peaked in Norway during the 1950s to 1980s, with above 2% of newly born boys named Geir during the late 1960s to 1970s. As of 2014, the National statistics office of Norway recorded 22,380 men with the given name, or 0.9% of total male population.
The Old Norse spelling Geirr is also rarely given (89 individuals in Norway as of 2014).
Geir is also rarely given in Sweden and Denmark.

While Geir was practically unused as a given name prior to the 1930s (and since the 2000s), -geir is the second element in a number of  given names inherited from Old Norse, the most popularly given being 
Asgeir and Torgeir. These are a remnant of a much larger group of names including the geirr element in Old Norse.

Notable people
Notable people called Geir include:

 Geir Bjørklund (b. 1969), Norwegian researcher, medical/health science writer, and editor
 Geir Digerud (b. 1956), Norwegian cyclist
 Geir Gripsrud (b. 1948), Norwegian organizational theorist
 Geir Haarde (b. 1951), Prime Minister of Iceland 2006–2009
 Geir Hallgrímsson (1925–1990), Prime Minister of Iceland 1974–1978)
 Geir Hasund (b. 1971), Norwegian soccer player
 Geir Helgemo (b. 1970), Norwegian bridge player
 Geir Ivarsøy (1957–2006), Norwegian programmer at Opera Software 
 Geir Jenssen (b. 1962), Norwegian musician best known under the recording name Biosphere
 Geir Hansteen Jörgensen (b. 1968), Swedish film director
 Geir Karlstad (b. 1963), Norwegian speed skater, Olympic gold and bronze medalist
 Geir Lippestad (b. 1964), Norwegian lawyer and politician
 Geir Moen (b. 1969), Norwegian sprinter
 Geir Suursild (born 1994), Estonian rower
 Geirr Tveitt  (1908–1981), Norwegian composer
 Geir Zahl (b. 1975), Norwegian musician

References 

Norwegian masculine given names
Scandinavian masculine given names